San Lazzaro may refer to:

 San Lazzaro degli Armeni, a small island in the Venetian Lagoon 
 San Lazzaro di Savena, an Italian comune in the Metropolitan City of Bologna, Emilia-Romagna

See also 

 Lazzaro (disambiguation)
 San Lazaro (disambiguation)